Jue Ze is a 2012 Chinese war-politicnal television series. It stars Ma Yue. The series focuses on the Japanese invasion of China from 1937 to 1945. It includes post-war antagonists, such as American soldiers and Chinese capitalists.

Synopsis 

After a brutal invasion of China by the Imperial Japanese Army in 1937, a Chinese professor in Boston named Wu Ming Tai is compelled by his patriotism to return to Beijing to translate a document for the United Nations. This document is considered to be proof of war crimes committed by the Japanese Army. The Japanese are aware of the Professor's return to China and will do anything to stop the publication of this discovery, including kidnapping his brother and forcing him to become a Japanese citizen.

When the American Army intervenes, they bomb Japanese fortresses. It is claimed, however, that the Americans want to claim China for themselves by taking control of Chinese fortifications. This plan is halted when an American soldier harasses a Chinese student, and the Americans are forced to withdraw, returning China's independence.

Meanwhile, Wu Ming Tai faces another enemy: his co-worker and brother-in-law, Chu Li Fan, a capitalist who wants to "corrupt China".

Cast 
Yue Ma as Wu Ming Tai
Yongjian Lin as General Zu
Ke Hu as Ju Ran
Xinyi Li as Lau Mei
Tenma Shibuya as Japanese Sergeant Sato
Sally Victoria Benson as Angelic
Johan Karlberg as Lieutenant Collins
Yajie Wang as Lichuan
Lui Xia as Qing Qing
Tianlai Hou as Chu Li Fan
Da Guo as Jinxue Gong

References

External links 

2012 Chinese television series debuts
Chinese action television series
Chinese-language television shows